Anthony Young may refer to:

Anthony Young (American football) (born 1963), American NFL defensive back
Anthony Young (baseball) (1966–2017), American Major League Baseball pitcher
Anthony Young (cyclist) (1900–1970), American Olympic cyclist
Anthony Young (musician) (1683–1747), English organist and composer
Anthony Young, Baron Young of Norwood Green (born 1942), British politician and Labour Party life peer
Anthony M. Young (born 1943), Australian mycologist
Anthony W. Young (1866–1948), Florida politician

See also
 Tony Young (disambiguation)